Supply may refer to:

The amount of a resource that is available
Supply (economics), the amount of a product which is available to customers
Materiel, the goods and equipment for a military unit to fulfill its mission
Supply, as in confidence and supply, the provision of funds for government expenditure
Narcissistic supply, the way in which a narcissistic individual requires affirmation, approval, and admiration from others in the same way as the infant requires an external supply of food

Places
Supply, North Carolina, an unincorporated community
Supply, Virginia, an unincorporated community

Ships
 HMS Supply, eight ships of the Royal Navy of the United Kingdom
 HMAS Supply, two ships of the Royal Australian Navy
 USS Supply, four ships of the United States Navy

People with the name
Supply Belcher (1751–1836), early American composer of the First New England School

Entertainment
"Supplies" (song), by Justin Timberlake, from his 2018 album Man of the Woods

See also
 Supply management (disambiguation)
 Supply ship (disambiguation)

sh:Dovod